RjB 9 and RjB 10 were two identical electric locomotives operated by Norsk Transport on Rjukanbanen in Norway. Built by Swiss Sécheron and German Jung in 1958, they served until the closing of the line in 1991.

The locomotives were equipped with four 183 kW motors, giving 732 kW in total. They could operate at 55 km/h, and were built for both 10 kV and 15 kV electrical systems; the former was used on Rjukanbanen until the older RjB 1–8 were retired in 1966, and the power changed to the standard of Norges Statsbaner.

A b/w photograph of unit # 9 heading a freight working en route appeared in "Locomotives made in Germany", 1966 ed., pg.15 bottom; issued by "Exportfoerderungsverband der deutschen Lokomotivindustrie", DE-Frankfurt/Main 1966, softcover, quadrilingual. Rating given at 830 kW by the caption; factor 1,13 reflects the ratio between a 1-hourly rating and a continuous rating (as likely given in the text here) for series-wound, directly-fed, single-phase ac electric motors. Unfortunately, no further detail was issued. Mechanical design reflects that of the shorter, yet heavier dual-power Bo'Bo' 600 V DC o/h-fed electric / diesel-electric locomotives supplied by Jung to the "E&H" docklands and smelting works railways of Duisburg-Hamborn at the same time.

References

Norsk Transport locomotives
Electric locomotives of Norway
Railway locomotives introduced in 1958
1958 establishments in Norway
Standard gauge locomotives of Norway